Alkylamines may refer to:

 Aliphatic amine
 Psychotropic alkylamines